Darryl Wohlsen (born 6 March 1973) is an Australian former sprinter who competed in the 2000 Summer Olympics.

References

1973 births
Living people
Australian male sprinters
Olympic athletes of Australia
Athletes (track and field) at the 2000 Summer Olympics
Athletes (track and field) at the 1998 Commonwealth Games
Commonwealth Games medallists in athletics
Commonwealth Games bronze medallists for Australia
Medallists at the 1998 Commonwealth Games